E. David Cook is a Fellow of Green College, Oxford and the first Holmes Professor of Faith and Learning at Wheaton College. He is also a visiting professor of Christian ethics at the Southern Baptist Theological Seminary in Louisville, Kentucky, and is a Senior Fellow of the Trinity Forum. He advises the archbishops and the British Government and is a member of the UK Xenotransplantation Interim Regulatory Authority. He lectures internationally and preaches in a wide variety of denominations.

He received his BS (summa cum laude) at Arizona State University in 1968 in philosophy of religion/philosophy.  In 1970 he received MA (first class honours), the University of Edinburgh in mental philosophy. In 1973 he received his PhD from the University of Edinburgh. In 1984, he received an MA from the University of Oxford. In 1999, he received D.Litt., honorary degree, Gordon College, Wenham, Massachusetts. He was also awarded an honorary Doctor of Divinity from Criswell College.

Selected papers

Books 
 The Moral Maze, Romanian edition 2004
 Blind Alley Beliefs, Turkish edition, 2005
 The Moral Maze, Spanish edition, 2005
 Not Just Science (ed. D F Chappell and E D Cook) Zondervan, Grand Rapids, 2005
 Consultant editor, Children of Prometheus, (ed. D Russ, P.Adman) Trinity Forum Publications 2005

Reviews
 The Soul of the Embryo, David Jones, Theology, 2005
 Aiming to Kill, Nigel Biggar, Third Way, 2005

Interviews
 Medical Ethics, ChristianPost.org, 2005
 Da Ali G Show, HBO, 2000
 Wheaton Underground, wetn.org, 2006

External links
 Biography- Wheaton College
 Biography- The Trinity Forum
 "Da Ali G Show"- IMDB

References

Alumni of the University of Edinburgh
Alumni of the University of Oxford
Fellows of Green Templeton College, Oxford
Place of birth missing (living people)
Year of birth missing (living people)
Arizona State University alumni
Living people
Wheaton College (Illinois) faculty
Southern Baptist Theological Seminary faculty